Ashfield is a constituency represented in the House of Commons of the UK Parliament by Lee Anderson of the Conservative Party. The constituency is in the English county of Nottinghamshire, East Midlands; located to the north west of the city of Nottingham in the Erewash Valley along the border with neighbouring county Derbyshire. Ashfield was part of the  Red Wall which by and large, voted Conservative in the 2019 general election. In the 2016 referendum on membership of the European Union, Ashfield voted 70% in favour of Brexit.

Constituency profile 
The seat contains the market towns of Kirkby-in-Ashfield, Sutton-in-Ashfield, Huthwaite and Eastwood. Coal mining was formerly a significant part of the economy.

Boundaries 

1955–1974: The Urban Districts of Eastwood, Kirkby-in-Ashfield, and Sutton-in-Ashfield, and in the Rural District of Basford the parishes of Annesley, Bestwood Park, Brinsley, Felley, Linby, Newstead, Papplewick, and Selston.

1974–1983: The Urban Districts of Hucknall, Kirkby-in-Ashfield, and Sutton-in-Ashfield, and in the Rural District of Basford the parishes of Annesley, Felley, and Selston.

1983–2010: The District of Ashfield wards of Jacksdale, Kirkby-in-Ashfield Central, Kirkby-in-Ashfield East, Kirkby-in-Ashfield West, Selston, Sutton-in-Ashfield Central, Sutton-in-Ashfield East, Sutton-in-Ashfield North, Sutton-in-Ashfield West, Underwood, and Woodhouse, and the Borough of Broxtowe wards of Brinsley, Eastwood East, Eastwood North, and Eastwood South.

2010–present: The District of Ashfield wards of Jacksdale, Kirkby-in-Ashfield Central, Kirkby-in-Ashfield East, Kirkby-in-Ashfield West, Selston, Sutton-in-Ashfield Central, Sutton-in-Ashfield East, Sutton-in-Ashfield North, Sutton-in-Ashfield West, Underwood, and Woodhouse, and the Borough of Broxtowe wards of Brinsley, Eastwood North and Greasley Beauvale, and Eastwood South.

History 
Until the Conservatives gained the seat at the 2019 general election, it was almost always a Labour Party seat since its creation for the 1955 general election. The Ashfield constituency has been served by a former Secretary of State, Geoff Hoon, and since its creation until 2019, for only two years has been served by one member of another party, Tim Smith of the Conservative Party, from 1977 to 1979. Ashfield's 2019 result indicates quite a large Conservative majority. In 2010, the seat had a marginal majority of only 192 votes over the Liberal Democrats, but this was increased to 8,820 in 2015 after a collapse in the Liberal Democrat vote, with the Conservatives finishing in second place. In 2017, there was another narrow margin of victory for Labour after an 8.9% swing to the Conservatives, who squeezed most of the fairly substantial UKIP vote from two years earlier, and also a large vote for the Ashfield Independents candidate of nearly 10%, but Labour on that occasion did just enough to hang on by just over 400 votes. In 2019, the Independent candidate Jason Zadrozny, who had come close to winning the seat for the Liberal Democrats nine years earlier, came second with a substantial vote, and the Conservatives took the seat despite achieving fewer votes and a smaller percentage of the total vote than in 2017.

Elections

Elections in the 2010s 

The Liberal Democrats had again selected Jason Zadrozny as their prospective parliamentary candidate for the 2015 general election, but he was suspended by the party and removed as a candidate just weeks before the election after being arrested and questioned for historic child sex abuse allegations, of which he was later cleared.  He was replaced by Philip Smith.

Elections in the 2000s

Elections in the 1990s

Elections in the 1980s

Elections in the 1970s

Elections in the 1960s

Elections in the 1950s

See also 
 1977 Ashfield by-election
 List of parliamentary constituencies in Nottinghamshire

Notes

References

Sources
 Youngs, Frederic A., Guide to the Local Administrative Units of England, Vol II, Northern England, London, 1991

Parliamentary constituencies in Nottinghamshire
Constituencies of the Parliament of the United Kingdom established in 1955